Suburbs of Shrewsbury refers to residential areas within the town of Shrewsbury, Shropshire, England. Many had been separate villages until the growth of the town.

 
Shrewsbury